"When Legends Rise" is a song by American rock band Godsmack. It was the second single off of their seventh studio album When Legends Rise.

Background and inspiration
In an interview with Billboard, Sully Erna told the magazine that "When Legends Rise" came from a sense of rebirth and reinvention on both personal and musical levels. In another interview, Erna provided further insight into what inspired him to write the song:

Erna went on to clarify that the "Legends" part of the title was not referring to Godsmack, but rather, it was "metaphorical" and "hopefully inspirational", concluding with "I'm certainly not saying that we're the legends!"

Track listing
Digital single

Music video
The music video for "When Legends Rise" was released on Jan 11, 2019. The clip, directed by Sully Erna in conjunction with Paris Visone, alternates between footage of the band performing live and highlights of pivotal moments in recent football history, concluding with a shot of the New England Patriots Super Bowl trophy. In a statement released by the band, it was revealed the clip was the result of Erna collaborating directly with the NFL for three months.

Appearances
The song is featured in the musical video game Rock Band 4 as a downloadable content. Also, it was used as a preview song to promote UFC 226. Moreover, WWE utilized the song as the official theme song for its 2018, 2019 and 2020 pay-per-view events WWE Greatest Royal Rumble, Crown Jewel and Super ShowDown that were held in Saudi Arabia.

Live performance
Godsmack debuted "When Legends Rise" on April 27, 2018 in Jacksonville, Florida. Since then, the song is regularly performed at the band's concerts.

Reception

Critical
Reviews for "When Legends Rise" were mostly positive. Blabbermouths reviewer Jay Gorania praised Shannon Larkin's performance on the track but noted that the chorus was "perfunctory at best." Chad Childers of Loudwire described the song as "pulsing with vitality." AllMusic's reviewer Neil Yeung described the song as a "rousing avalanche of drums and guitar" and praised Erna's vocal delivery.

Commercial
Upon its release, "When Legends Rise" entered multiple charts, including the Billboard Mainstream Rock. Like the previous  single from the album, it peaked at number one where it remained for five consecutive weeks, giving Godsmack their ninth number one single on that chart.

PersonnelGodsmack'
 Sully Erna – vocals, rhythm guitar, production
 Tony Rombola – lead guitar
 Robbie Merrill – bass
 Shannon Larkin – drums

Charts

Weekly charts

Year-end charts

Certifications

References

2018 singles
2018 songs
Godsmack songs
Songs written by Sully Erna